Nekielka  is a village in the administrative district of Gmina Nekla, within Września County, Greater Poland Voivodeship, in west-central Poland. A notable building is the Evangelical Church, Nekielka.

References

Nekielka